Tepa is a genus of stink bugs in the family Pentatomidae. There are about 6 described species in Tepa.

Species
 Tepa brevis (Van Duzee, 1904)
 Tepa jugosa (Van Duzee, 1923)
 Tepa panda (Van Duzee, 1923)
 Tepa rugulosa (Say, 1832)
 Tepa vanduzeei Rider, 1986
 Tepa yerma (Rolston, 1972)

References

Further reading

 
 
 

Pentatomidae genera
Pentatomini